The Coyhaique tuco-tuco (Ctenomys coyhaiquensis) is a species of rodent in the family Ctenomyidae. It is endemic to southern Chile. The name comes from the Chilean province and municipality of Coyhaique.

References

Tuco-tucos
Mammals of Chile
Mammals of Patagonia
Mammals described in 1994
Endemic fauna of Chile